Allangrange may refer to:

Places in Scotland
Allangrange Mains, Highland, Scotland
Muir of Allangrange, Highland, Scotland

See also
Allangrange railway station, station in Ross and Cromarty